Kızıllı can refer to:

 Kızıllı, Alaca
 Kızıllı, Antalya
 Kızıllı, Bucak
 Kızıllı, Dinar